Michel Porasso (20 August 1891 – 6 August 1944) was a Monegasque gymnast. He competed in the men's artistic individual all-around event at the 1920 Summer Olympics.

References

1891 births
1944 deaths
Monegasque male artistic gymnasts
Olympic gymnasts of Monaco
Gymnasts at the 1920 Summer Olympics
Place of birth missing